The Fourth Amendment to the Constitution of Pakistan (Urdu: آئین پاکستان میں چوتھی ترمیم) is an amendment that became part of the Constitution of Pakistan on November 21, 1975, under the Government of Prime minister Zulfikar Ali Bhutto.  The IV Amendment decreed the seats for minorities and non-Muslims representation to the government of Pakistan and the Parliament of Pakistan, to protect the minority rights in the country. The IV Amendment also deprived courts of the power to grant bail to any accused or innocent [person] until proven guilty under any preventive detention. The IV Amendment protect the rights of Minorities in the country, and also protect the rights of accused [person] until proven guilty from the police brutality during the subsequent investigations.

Text

References

04
Government of Zulfikar Ali Bhutto